The French submarine Antigone was an  diesel-electric attack submarine originally ordered by Greece. It was built in the Schneider-Creusot shipyards between 1912 and 1917, but was requisitioned on 30 May 1917 by the French Government before it was delivered. Antigone operated in the Mediterranean during the course of World War I and was stricken from the Navy list in August 1935.

Design
Propulsion while surfaced was provided by two  diesel motors built by the Swiss manufacturer Schneider-Carels and two  electric motors.

Antigone was armed with four  torpedo tubes and a  L/50 M1902 Hotchkiss deck gun.  The crew of one ship consisted of 31 officers and seamen.

Construction and service 
Antigone was ordered by the Greek Navy in 1912, with a design Maxime Laubeuf. The ship, which received the name PS, was requisitioned by the French Government on 30 May 1917 during World War I.

Antigone was built in the Schneider shipyard in Chalon-sur-Saône. It was laid down in 1912, launched in October 1916, and completed in January 1917. It was named after a character in Greek mythology, Antigone. Antigone received the designation SD3.

After its launching, Antigone served on the Adriatic Sea until 1918, when it was assigned to the 3rd submarine Flotilla, based in Moudros. Antigone was struck from the Naval register in August 1935.

References

Citations 

 

World War I submarines of France
Armide-class submarines
1916 ships